Osbaldwick is a village and civil parish in the unitary authority of the City of York in North Yorkshire, England. The population of the civil parish as taken at the Census 2011 was 2,902.  It has been in existence since at least the 11th century, and was declared a conservation area in 1978. It is the burial place of the nun Mary Ward.

History

It is mentioned three times in the Domesday Book as Osboldewic. It is named after Osbald, an earl in the kingdom of Northumbria. At that time the manor was assessed with the city of York and the lands held by the Church of St Peter, York. It was the first Norman Archbishop of York that created the office of Prebend of Osbaldwick. The earliest mention of an incumbent of this office was of Richard le Brun in 1270. The office was de facto lord of the manor of the village. In 1852, the Church was allowed to sell off land and Osbaldwick Manor was sold to a Thomas Samuel Watkinson, later the Lord Mayor of York.

The village was historically part of the North Riding of Yorkshire until 1974. It was then a part of the district of Ryedale in North Yorkshire from 1974 until 1996. Since 1996 it has been part of the City of York unitary authority.

Governance

The village is within the York Outer UK Parliament constituency. It is also a ward of the same name within York Unitary Authority.

Geography

The village proper lies mostly along one street called Osbaldwick Village. Newer housing surrounds this and Osbaldwick is now effectively bounded on three sides by the A1079 to the south, the A64 that forms part of York's Ring Road) to the east and by green-belt land to the north. To the west, newer housing merges into the Tang Hall district.

Light industrial/trading estates exist to the east of the village heading towards Murton) and along Osbaldwick Link Road which links it to the A1079. A new (2006) housing development built in 2006, known as Murton Gardens, was built by Wimpey Homes on the link road on the site of a farm building and surrounding fields. A development known as Derwenthorpe was granted planning permission on 10 May 2007 for the green-belt land north of the village. Some farmland also exists between Osbaldwick and Murton.

Osbaldwick Beck runs through the village and is part of the tributary system of the River Foss.

Demography

The 1881 UK Census recorded the population as 340. According to the 2001 UK Census the parish had a population of 2,726, of which 2,243 were over the age of sixteen years and 1,115 of those were in employment. There were 1,200 dwellings of which 364 were detached.

Transport

Between 1913 and 1926 Osbaldwick was served by a station on the Derwent Valley Light Railway. This line remained open to freight until 1981, and Sustrans National Cycle Route 66 now runs on the former track bed from the village into York.

Osbaldwick is also served by two bus routes operated by First York on their service 6 between Clifton Moor and University Campus East and Transdev York on their service 20 between Rawcliffe and Osbaldwick (Limited service frequency).

Landmarks

The village is home to Osbaldwick Hall, a Grade II Listed Building, and to the 12th century St Thomas' Church.

Eliza Raine (1793–1860) is buried in St. Thomas cemetery. Raine was the first partner to the celebrated English landowner and diarist Anne Lister.

Facilities

The village has two pubs, the Derwent Arms in the old part of the village and the Magnet near the newer houses on Osbaldwick Lane, as well as a small number of local shops. The village post office closed in July 2003.

Education in the village is provided by Osbaldwick Primary School, and most pupils transfer after Year 6 to Archbishop Holgate's School.

Derwent Arms

The Derwent Arms was built in 1823 when it was known as The Black Bull. It consisted of the main pub house and a stable for two horses with a granary over it. To the right were two cow houses with a small orchard and pig pen behind. In front of this was another outbuilding. In the early years the pub had a wash house. Later, a long cattle shed for eight to nine cows was added onto the west side of the stable. It was later renamed The Derwent Arms after the Derwent Valley Light Railway which used to run through the village. It currently consists of a rendered brick building with the public rooms on the ground floor and accommodation for the owners above. The pub has a large field which is used to host community events such as the village fair and a bonfire night.

Religion
The 12th-century Church of England parish church dedicated to St Thomas originally dates from the 12th century. Windows in the north wall date from the 12th, 13th and 14th century. The church has been reordered and extended on a number of occasions, notably in 1877 by John Oldrid Scott and by later architects in both 1967 and 2005.

The Rev. William Ball Wright, noted genealogist and one of the first SPG Anglican missionaries to Japan, served as vicar of the parish from 1903 to 1912.

A window in the church is a memorial to former Sheriff and Lord Mayor of York, James Barber. It is the burial place of the Roman Catholic nun Mary Ward, who founded the Institute of the Blessed Virgin Mary, also known as the Sisters of Loreto. The Church registers show that a Dorothy Paston Bedingfield, a superior of the order, was also buried here.

References

Villages in North Yorkshire
Civil parishes in North Yorkshire
Villages and areas in the City of York